Albert Edwin Mitchell (August 30, 1897 – May 12, 1967) was a professional American football player for the Buffalo Bisons, playing six games in 1924. He went to Thiel College. He was born in Greenville, Pennsylvania. He was a tailback, a center and an end. He died in Livonia, New York.

References

1897 births
1967 deaths
People from Greenville, Pennsylvania
American football halfbacks
American football centers
American football wide receivers
Thiel Tomcats football players
Buffalo Bisons (NFL) players
Players of American football from Pennsylvania